Crime in Mauritania is moderate but steadily increasing. Most incidents occur in the cities and larger towns and are petty crimes, such as pickpocketing and the theft of improperly secured or openly visible valuables left in vehicles. Most criminal activity occurs at night. Residential burglaries and robberies, particularly at the beaches in Nouakchott, are not uncommon. Violent crimes and crimes involving the use of weapons are rare, but increasing.

In recent years, Mauritania, like much of West Africa has become a distribution hub for cocaine trafficking from Colombia to Europe.

References

 
Society of Mauritania
Law of Mauritania